The 2011 FIFA U-20 World Cup was the 18th FIFA U-20 World Cup. Colombia hosted the tournament between 29 July and 20 August 2011, with matches being played in eight cities. The tournament was won by Brazil who claimed their fifth title.

At a FIFA Executive Committee meeting held in Sydney on 26 May 2008, Colombia beat the only other candidate country, Venezuela, for the right to organize the U-20 World Cup. It was suggested by the then-Vice President of Colombia Francisco Santos Calderón that it was needed to withdraw from the race with Brazil to host the 2014 FIFA World Cup so the nation could concentrate on hosting the "best possible games".

In an inspection tour of development works in March 2010, Jack Warner, then the vice president of FIFA, said that the completion of this tournament could provide Colombia with a launch pad to become a possible host for the 2026 World Cup. The official song of the tournament was "Nuestra Fiesta" by Colombian singer Jorge Celedón.

Venues 
The venues that were confirmed on 29 September 2010 are located in Bogotá, Cali, Medellín, Manizales, Armenia, Cartagena, Pereira and Barranquilla.

During an announcement about the ticketing procedures for Colombian residents, it was confirmed that the opening game would be held at the Estadio Metropolitano Roberto Meléndez in Barranquilla, with the Estadio El Campín hosting the final match.

Participating teams and officials

Qualification 

In addition to host nation Colombia, 23 nations qualified from six separate continental competitions.

1.Teams that made their debut.

Match officials

Squads

Group stage 
The draw for the group stage was held on 27 April 2011, at the Julio Cesar Turbay Ayala Convention Centre in Cartagena. The seedings were as follows.

The winners and runners-up from each group, as well as the best four third-placed teams, will qualify for the first round of the knockout stage (round of 16).

 
Tie-breaking criteria
Where two or more teams end the group stage with the same number of points, their ranking is determined by the following criteria:

 goal difference in all group matches;
 number of goals scored in all group matches;
 points earned in the matches between the teams concerned;
 goal difference in the matches between the teams concerned;
 number of goals scored in the group matches between the teams concerned;
 drawing of lots by the organising committee.

Ranking of third place teams in each group are determined by the following criteria, top four advances to the round of 16:

 number of points
 goal difference in all group matches;
 number of goals scored in all group matches;
 drawing of lots by the organising committee.

All times are in local, Colombia Time (UTC−05:00).

Group A

Group B

Group C

Group D

Group E

Group F

Ranking of third-placed teams

Knockout stage

Round of 16

Quarterfinals

Semifinals

Third place match

Final

Statistics

Goalscorers 
With five goals, Henrique, Alexandre Lacazette and Álvaro Vázquez are the top scorers in the tournament. In total, 132 goals were scored by 80 different players, with three of them credited as own goals.

5 goals

 Henrique
 Alexandre Lacazette
 Álvaro Vázquez

4 goals

 Luis Muriel
 Nélson Oliveira

3 goals

 Erik Lamela
 Philippe Coutinho
 Dudu
 Oscar
 James Rodríguez
 John Jairo Ruiz
 Mohamed Ibrahim
 Edson Rivera
 Edafe Egbedi
 Olarenwaju Kayode
 Ahmed Musa
 Rodrigo

2 goals

 Thomas Oar
 Willian José
 Joel Campbell
 Marlon de Jesús
 Gueïda Fofana
 Gilles Sunu
 Bright Ejike
 Uche Nwofor
 Yasir Al-Fahmi
 Sergio Canales

1 goal

 Ezequiel Cirigliano
 Facundo Ferreyra
 Lucas Villafáñez
 Kerem Bulut
 Danilo
 Gabriel Silva
 Christ Mbondi
 Emmanuel Mbongo
 Frank Ohandza
 Santiago Arias
 Pedro Franco
 José Adolfo Valencia
 Duván Zapata
 Javier Escoe
 Andrej Kramarić
 Ivan Lendrić
 Juan Govea
 Edson Montaño
 Omar Gaber
 Ahmed Hegazy
 Mohamed Salah
 Mohamed Sobhi
 Cédric Bakambu
 Antoine Griezmann
 Marvin Ceballos
 Ulises Dávila
 Diego de Buen
 Jorge Enríquez
 Taufic Guarch
 Carlos Emilio Orrantía
 Erick Torres Padilla
 Andrew Bevin
 Abdul Jeleel Ajagun
 Terna Suswam
 Alex
 Danilo Pereira
 Mário Rui
 Salem Al-Dawsari
 Mohammed Al-Fatil
 Ibrahim Al-Ibrahim
 Fahad Al-Muwallad
 Yasser Al-Shahrani
 Yahya Dagriri
 Jang Hyun-soo
 Kim Kyung-jung
 Kim Young-uk
 Isco
 Koke
 Sergi Roberto
 Adrián Luna

1 own goal

 Tchaha Leouko (playing against New Zealand)
 Francisco Calvo (playing against Australia)
 Ri Yong-chol (playing against Mexico)

Final ranking

Awards
The following awards were given:

Organization 

In late 2009 the Colombian Football Federation unveiled the budget for conducting the event, to be COP 150 billion (US$75 million). On 30 September 2009, the presidents of both FIFA and Colombia announced that the logo would show a steaming cup of coffee with the colours of the Colombian tricolour.

Opening ceremony 
Prior to the start of the tournament, the Estadio Metropolitano Roberto Meléndez in Barranquilla hosted the Opening Ceremony, involving local musical performances and guests including Jorge Celedón, Barranquilla's Carnival Performers, Checo Acosta and Maía.

Closing ceremony 
The Estadio El Campín in Bogotá hosted the Closing Ceremony. The show was managed by the Ibero-American Theater Festival and Teatro Nacional de Colombia and, like the opening ceremony, included musical performances.

References

External links

FIFA U-20 World Cup Colombia 2011 , FIFA.com
RSSSF > FIFA World Youth Championship > 2011
FIFA Technical Report

 
2011
FIFA U-20 World Cup
FIFA U-20 World Cup
2011

July 2011 sports events in South America
August 2011 sports events in South America
Sport in Barranquilla
Sports competitions in Bogotá
Sport in Cali
21st century in Barranquilla